Each year, Forbes India issues a list of India's richest people, called the "India Rich List". Since 2008, Mukesh Ambani has been the richest Indian, with his wealth based in Reliance Industries. but after that adani has taken Mukesh Ambani rank

List

References 

Net worth
Wealth in India
Indian billionaires
Economy of India lists